Burry Port Lifeboat Station (near Llanelli, Carmarthenshire, Wales) first opened in 1887, with all funds coming from a legacy left by Mr and Mrs Barclay. 
The station was moved to Burry Port, due to the original lifeboat based at Llanelli being deemed too far away to be helpful; and the previous station based in Pembrey put at risk due to storms.

The station was closed for over half a century between 1914 and 1973 as it was deemed un-needed by the Royal National Lifeboat Institution.

The station currently operates a  named Diane Hilary and a  named Misses Barrie

History

Burry Port Lifeboat Station opened in 1887 after moving twice in the previous 30 years. The station was allocated a 32-foot-long (9.8 m), 10-oar lifeboat named Stanton Meyrick of Pimlico which operated until 1886, when the boathouse was also abandoned due to operational issues in launching and recovering at that site.

The boathouse was built on the eastern side of Burry Port Harbour in 1887 to replace it, and up until the station closed in 1914 operated three different lifeboats, all named David Barclay of Tottenham, and saved a total of 34 lives.

In 1973, due to an increase in drowning incidents in Carmarthen Bay, the Royal National Lifeboat Institution decided to reopen the station and allocate it a D class lifeboat. 

In 2002 a Coast review acknowledged the need for a larger craft to complement the existing D class lifeboat and decided that a B class Atlantic 75 lifeboat would also be stationed here.  

Following the delivery of the Atlantic 75 in 2010, which was housed in a temporary building, the dire need for a new boathouse to accommodate both boats under one roof was identified.

It would also offer, better volunteer facilities, increased capacity for school and group visits, a visitor experience with a shop and would be easier to manage. It would also be large enough to house a new Atlantic 85, a larger and more capable boat than the existing Atlantic 75.

Plans were drawn up and in Sept 2019 the new facility was officially opened and the new Atlantic 85 commissioned. The new building was designed by Llanelli Architects, Lewis Partnership Ltd.

Fleet

All Weather Boats

Inshore Lifeboats

D-class

B-class

See also
 Royal National Lifeboat Institution
 List of Royal National Lifeboat Institution stations

References

External links
 The official website of Burry Port Lifeboat
 Burry Port Lifelboat Station

Lifeboat stations in Wales
Transport infrastructure completed in 1887